Aaron Richmond (October 28, 1895, in Salem, Massachusetts – April 21, 1965, in Boston, Massachusetts) was an American performing arts manager, pianist, impresario, and educator, based in Boston, Massachusetts, who managed the careers of numerous classical musicians and founded Celebrity Series of Boston, a performing arts presenting organization that still operates today.

Early years

Aaron Richmond was born in 1895 in Salem, Massachusetts, where he had his formal education. After graduating from high school, he intensified his musical training with the goal of becoming a concert pianist. The following was noted in a brief Boston Globe review of a 1919 performance in which Richmond accompanied baritone Giovanni Petrucci at Boston's Steinert Hall, "Mr. Petrucci was assisted by Aaron Richmond, who played his accompaniments and a group of piano pieces."

In 1917, Richmond toured extensively as a pianist with the Tchaikovsky Quartet. During the same period, Richmond's friend, conductor Arthur Fiedler, was forced to cancel a series of bookings on the Chautauqua circuit. Mr. Richmond filled in as pianist on the tour and later organized Richmond’s Little Symphony, a sextet that toured the circuit for several summers playing arrangements of orchestral works. He served as pianist and lecturer on the program and often the newspaper critic of the concerts. Richmond’s Little Symphony made at least one Chautuaqua circuit tour with William Jennings Bryan.

Artist Manager

An onstage lapse of memory during Richmond's Boston debut caused him to reevaluate his professional goals and led him to a career in music management. His first office contained a studio where he continued to teach piano while he formed the core of his artists’ list from members of the Boston Symphony Orchestra and some prominent Boston vocalists.

Pianist Ignace Jan Paderewski was quoted as saying of Richmond, "[He was] perhaps the only manager I have ever known to whom the word 'suite' has meant a musical composition and not a set of furniture for a room."
In the Daily Boston Globe in 1948, Richmond said of himself, "Music to me is not just a business, an occupation, but a passion ... presenting great artists to the public, and expanding that public, is my mission. I never feel right unless I am convinced that my artists are of top rank."

First Roster
Aaron Richmond Concert Management's roster for the 1920–21 season included pianist Felix Fox, cellist Jean Bedetti, soprano Laura Littlefield, flutist Georges Laurent, the American String Quartette, the Smalley Trio, the operatic duo of Mr. and Mrs. George Mager and the Boston Symphony Ensemble, under the direction of Augusto Vannini.

In the ensuing decades, Richmond also represented soprano Claudine Leeve, violinist Carmela Ippolito, pianists Harrison Potter and Leo Podolsky, the Durrell String Quartet, tenor Joseph Lautner, the Fiedler Trio (Arthur Fiedler, violin; Alfred Hoy, harp, and Jacobus Lengendoen, cello), the Boston Sinfonietta, conducted by Arthur Fiedler, and piano and vocal folk-song duo Constance and Henry Gideon.

In the early 1920s, Richmond was appointed the New England Manager of the Wolfsohn Musical Bureau, Inc. and, later, became the sole New England representative for the National Concert and Artists Corporation, and later for the NBC Artists Service. In this role, Richmond was the New England artist representative for Sergei Rachmaninoff, Mischa Levitski, Kirsten Flagstad, Fritz Kreisler, Monte Carlo Ballet Russe and the Vienna Choir Boys, among many others.

Concert Presenter

First Concert Series
Richmond presented his first concert series in Boston during the 1924–25 season. The new venture, called the Wolfsohn Series, included sopranos Katherine Palmer, Kathleen McAlister, Suzanne Dabney, Mildred Cobb and Laura Littlefield; contraltos Abbie Conley Rice, Betty Gray and Rose Zulalian; mezzo-soprano Elena Gerhardt; baritones, Parish Williams, William Richardson, Wellington Smith, and Ernest Lamoureaux; pianists Winifred Byrd, Moriz Rosenthal, Cyrus Ullian, Hyman Rovinsky, Alexander Brailowsky, George Smith, Harold Morris, Harrison Potter, Grace Cronin, Guiomar Novaes, Alfredo Oswald, and Alberto Sciarretti; the Kibalchich Russian Symphonic Choir and The Roman Choir; the Fox-Burgin-Bedetti Trio; cellist Felix Salmond and violinists Joseph Coleman, Harry Farbman, and Paul Cherkassky.

Over the next several years, Richmond also presented such noted artists as pianist and composer Sergei Rachmaninoff, singer and composer J. Rosamond Johnson, pianist Harold Samuel, contralto Margarete Matzenauer, the Fisk Jubilee Singers, Harrison Keller, Denoe Leedy, violinist Albert Spalding, the People's Symphony Orchestra and the Cleveland Orchestra.

The Celebrity Series Launched

Aaron Richmond's Celebrity Series was launched (12 years after his first concert series) for the 1938-39 concert season. In 1953, still under Aaron Richmond's direction, the Celebrity Series affiliated with Boston University and took the name, the Boston University Celebrity Series.

In 1984, the Celebrity Series changed affiliations and moved its operations under the auspices of the Wang Center for the Performing Arts. Then, in 1989, the Celebrity Series incorporated as Bank of Boston Celebrity Series, an independent, non-profit institution with its own Board of Directors and an annual budget of over $3 million. Today the Celebrity Series annual operating budget is approximately $7 million. After 18 years of operating with the title sponsorship support of Bank of Boston, BankBoston, FleetBoston Financial, and Bank of America, the Celebrity Series began operating under its incorporated name, Celebrity Series of Boston, in June 2007.

Aaron Richmond presented many performers during his 27-year tenure as director of the Celebrity Series of Boston:

Music

 Adolf Busch
 Alexander Brailowsky
 Andrés Segovia
 Artur Rubinstein
 Artur Schnabel
 Arturo Toscanini
 Béla Bartók
 Benny Goodman
 Berlin Philharmonic
 Birgit Nilsson
 Boris Goldovsky
 Burl Ives
 Chicago Symphony Orchestra
 Cleveland Orchestra
 Claudio Arrau
 Efrem Zimbalist
 Elisabeth Schwarzkopf
 Eugene Ormandy
 Ezio Pinza
 Francis Poulenc
 Fritz Kreisler
 George Szell
 Glenn Gould
 Gregor Piatigorsky
 Guarneri Quartet
 Herbert von Karajan
 Ignace Jan Paderewski
 Igor Stravinsky
 Isaac Stern
 Israel Philharmonic
 Jascha Heifetz
 Joseph Szigeti
 Juilliard String Quartet
 Kirsten Flagstad
 Leon Fleisher
 Lily Pons
 Maria Callas
 Marian Anderson
 NBC Symphony Orchestra
 New York Philharmonic
 Philadelphia Orchestra
 Roland Hayes
 Rudolf Serkin
 Jan Smeterlin
 Sergei Rachmaninoff
 Trapp Family Singers
 Van Cliburn
 Victor Borge
 Vienna Philharmonic
 Vladimir Horowitz
 Yehudi Menuhin

Dance

 Agnes de Mille Dance Theatre
 Angna Enters
 Ballet Russe de Monte Carlo
 Bolshoi Ballet
 Destine Haitian Dance Company
 Geoffrey Holder Dance Company
 Iva Kitchell
 Jooss European Ballet
 Jose Greco & his Spanish Dancers
 Katherine Dunham
 Kirov Ballet
 Martha Graham and Company
 Merce Cunningham Dance Company
 Original Ballet Russe, Col. De Basil, Director General
 Pearl Primus Dance Company
 Sadlers Wells Ballet/Royal Ballet
 Trudi Schoop and Her Dancing Comedians
 Uday Shankar and his Hindu Ballet

Theatre/Speakers

 Bristol Old Vic
 Cornelia Otis Skinner
 Emlyn Williams as Charles Dickens
 Hal Holbrook in "Mark Twain Tonight!"
 Ruth Draper
 Sir Thomas Beecham

Following Richmond's death on April 21, 1965, his associate Walter Pierce assumed direction of the Celebrity Series. In 1986, Mr. Pierce hired Martha H. Jones as the Celebrity Series' Director of Marketing. She later became General Manager, and, in 1996, when Mr. Pierce retired his full-time post, Martha Jones was appointed Executive Director. Following Martha Jones' retirement from the Celebrity Series in 2011, Gary Dunning was appointed to the position.

Association with Sol Hurok
Aaron Richmond's business association with noted impresario Sol Hurok dated from 1926. Richmond frequently served as the regional representative for Hurok's tours. On Richmond's death in 1965, Hurok said in The Boston Globe, "Aaron Richmond contributed to Boston what Hurok contributes to New York. He had the ideal spirit: 'Boston should see this company, hear this musician.' That came first, money later. That made cultural life blossom.
He wanted, so do I, that this country should know what is going on in the world. he put all his time, energy, vitality, knowledge to do it. I have lost a good friend."

Other projects
Richmond served as artistic advisor to numerous colleges and committees throughout the New England area, including the Boston Morning Musical Association (Boston, Massachusetts), the Harvard Musical Association (Boston, Massachusetts), Weston Country Evening Concert Series, South End Music Centre (Boston, Massachusetts), Boston Community Music Centre (Boston, Massachusetts), the James Spooner Fund Concerts (Plymouth, Massachusetts), Gile Fund Concerts (Concord, New Hampshire), the Greater New Bedford Concert Series (New Bedford, Massachusetts), Temple Beth El Concert Series (Providence, Rhode Island), the South Shore Concert Association (Massachusetts), as well as Smith and Williams Colleges, the Massachusetts Institute of Technology and the Connecticut College for Women.

Aaron Richmond was a founding member of the Concerts Association of America, founded in 1937 "to meet the pressing problems now confronting the concert-giving field." In 1951, Richmond was elected Vice President of the National Association of Concert Managers, which later became the International Society for the Performing Arts (ISPA)  .

Richmond took over direction of the Castle Hill Festival in Ipswich, Massachusetts, in 1964 where he organized the New England debut of violinist Itzhak Perlman and a concert by an eighteen-year-old Peter Serkin.

Richmond also taught piano throughout his career, and for years kept a room adjacent to his business office in which he taught piano.

Honors
The French government made Aaron Richmond a Chevalier of The Ordre des Arts et des Lettres in 1961, and the West German government gave him the Order of Merit of the Federal Republic of Germany in 1962 for his role in the cultural exchange program.

References

External links
Celebrity Series of Boston web site
Celebrity Series of Boston Blog

1895 births
1965 deaths
Musicians from Boston
Talent managers
Impresarios
Recipients of the Order of Merit of the Federal Republic of Germany
20th-century American pianists
American male pianists
20th-century American male musicians